NBC Sports Edge (formerly Rotoworld) is an American fantasy sports and sports betting website. It features sports news and analysis for fantasy sports and sports betting. 

Rotoworld was acquired by NBC Sports in 2006. In 2019, the site underwent a redesign with a larger focus on video content, mobile, and new search tools. In February 2021, Rotoworld was rebranded as NBC Sports Edge, carrying a larger emphasis on sports betting content and integration with NBC Sports television programming.

The site offers a line of premium subscription tiers, branded as Edge+, which offer advanced analysis, statistics, and tools for fantasy sports and sports betting.

Awards and recognition

2005 
 Fantasy Sports Trade Association: Fantasy Content and services award for "Fantasy Magazine"

2007 
 Fantasy Sports Trade Association: Unique Contest
 Fantasy Sports Trade Association: Draft Kit
 Fantasy Sports Trade Association: Fantasy Magazine
 Fantasy Sports Trade Association: Online Content service

2008 
 Fantasy Sports Trade Association: Best Online Content Service

2009 
 Fantasy Sports Trade Association: Fantasy Content and Services award for: "Draft Kit" & "Specialty Products or Services"

2011 
 Fantasy Sports Trade Association: Most Valuable Fantasy Content

2012 
 Fantasy Sports Trade Association: Most Innovative Fantasy Product or Service

2013 
 Fantasy Sports Trade Association: Most Valuable Fantasy Content

2014
 Fantasy Sports Trade Association: Best Content: Multiple-Sports Sites
 Fantasy Sports Writers Association: Matthew Pouilot, 2014 Hall of Fame Class
 Fantasy Sports Writers Association: Best Football Series Column - Evan Silva
 Fantasy Sports Writers Association: Basketball Writer of the Year - Aaron Bruski

References

Daily fantasy sports
NBC Sports